Korkino is the name of several inhabited localities in Russia.

Urban localities
Korkino, Chelyabinsk Oblast, a town in Korkinsky District of Chelyabinsk Oblast

Rural localities
Korkino, Kostroma Oblast, a village in Serednyakovskoye Settlement of Kostromskoy District in Kostroma Oblast; 
Korkino, Tosnensky District, Leningrad Oblast, a village under the administrative jurisdiction of Lyubanskoye Settlement Municipal Formation in Tosnensky District of Leningrad Oblast; 
Korkino, Vsevolozhsky District, Leningrad Oblast, a village in Koltushskoye Settlement Municipal Formation of Vsevolozhsky District in Leningrad Oblast; 
Korkino, Tyumen Oblast, a selo in Korkinsky Rural Okrug of Uporovsky District in Tyumen Oblast
Korkino, Gavrilov-Yamsky District, Yaroslavl Oblast, a village in Shopshinsky Rural Okrug of Gavrilov-Yamsky District in Yaroslavl Oblast
Korkino, Nekouzsky District, Yaroslavl Oblast, a village in Shestikhinsky Rural Okrug of Nekouzsky District in Yaroslavl Oblast
Korkino, Rybinsky District, Yaroslavl Oblast, a village in Makarovsky Rural Okrug of Rybinsky District in Yaroslavl Oblast